British singer and songwriter James Arthur has released four studio albums, thirty-three singles (including eight as a featured artist), and seventeen music videos. He won the ninth series of The X Factor in 2012 and released "Impossible" as the winner's single.

Following his X Factor victory, Arthur's winner's song, a cover of Shontelle's 2010 song "Impossible", was released as a charity single for Together for Short Lives. The single topped the UK Singles Chart in its first week of release. After 11 days, it was the seventh-biggest-selling debut single from any contestant from The X Factor, with sales of 622,000. After three weeks, it was the fifth-best-selling single of 2012, with 897,000 copies sold. The song also peaked at number one in Ireland, number two in Australia, New Zealand and Switzerland. By 2015 it had sold over 1.4 million copies in the UK, overtaking Alexandra Burke's "Hallelujah" to become the best-selling winner's single ever.

On 7 August 2013, Arthur announced that his next single would be called "You're Nobody 'til Somebody Loves You". The song was released on 20 October 2013 and debuted at number two in the UK, falling just behind Lorde's "Royals". Arthur's self-titled debut studio album, James Arthur, was released on 4 November 2013. The album charted in the UK at number two, behind Eminem's The Marshall Mathers LP 2. "Recovery" was released as the album's third single on 15 December 2013 and debuted at number 19 on the UK Singles Chart.

In 2014, following a string of controversies in the British media, he parted ways with Syco Music, and in September 2015 he signed to Columbia Records in Germany.  A year later, he released a new single, "Say You Won't Let Go"—the first from his second studio album, Back from the Edge—which gave him his second UK chart-topper, and as of November 2017 it had sold two million copies worldwide. It also became his breakthrough hit in the US, reaching number 11 on the Billboard Hot 100 and being certified triple platinum.

In 2018, Arthur was featured in "The Power of Love", the UK X Factor-winning song by the season 15 winner Dalton Harris. The duet was a cover of an original by Frankie Goes to Hollywood from 1984.

Arthur's third studio album, You, was released on 18 October 2019; the album debuted at number 2 on the UK Albums Chart, where it stayed for one week.

Albums

Studio albums

Independent studio albums

Mixtapes

Extended plays

Singles

As lead artist

As featured artist

Promotional singles

Other charted songs

Other appearances

Music videos

Songwriting credits

Notes

References

Discography
Discographies of British artists
Pop music discographies